Megat Burhainuddin bin Megat Abdul Rahman was an ex Vice-Chancellor and Chief Executive Officer of Nilai University, as well as the Deputy Chairman of the St. John Council of Malaysia and Deputy Commander-in-Chief of St. John Ambulance of Malaysia.

Career
After graduating from the Faculty of Medicine, University of Malaya, Megat Burhainuddin has undergone specialty training in Public Health Medicine and served in the Government of Malaysia for 30 years as Public Health Medicine Specialist with special interest in Health Services Management Health Planning and Health Manpower Planning. Following this he attended other courses in several Universities, including Health Planning in University of Toronto, Canada; Health Economics in London School of Hygiene & Tropical Medicine, University of London, Management Training in Central Officer Training Institute in Seoul, Korea, and Advanced Management in Harvard Business School, Harvard University, USA.

In the area of training he held the position of Director of the Institute of Public Health and Director of Training and Manpower Planning at the Ministry of Health. In Health Services Management he was appointed the Director of Kuala Lumpur Hospital during which he was responsible for smooth running and efficient management of the premier hospital and the National Referral Centre of the country's medical care system. Following this, he was responsible for planning for the Health Services of the country as Director of Planning and Development. The last appointment held in the Ministry of Health was the Deputy Director General of Health where he was given responsibility of coordinating the development of Medical Care Services.

After his retirement from the civil service and prior to his appointment at MAHSA University College, he was the Principal and Chief Executive Officer of Melaka-Manipal Medical College, an educational institution twinned with Manipal Academy of Higher Education, an established deemed University in India.

Megat Burhainuddin also has presented papers at both local and international level on varying topics in relation to Health Policy Formulation and Development;, in particular, Health Economics and Financing; Health Technology Development and Health Manpower Development. He was appointed as short-term consultants by international organizations, including W.H.O., in the field of Health Services Management, Health Planning and Human Resources Development including Training; and, I.D.R.C., Canada, in the field of Health Systems Research.

Appointments
Megat Burhainuddin is a council member of the Malaysian Medical Council. As a council member, he has presided over a number of Preliminary Investigation Committees, including the probe into the possible misconduct on the post-mortem conducted on A. Kugan, a detainee who died in 2009 whilst in police custody.

He is also a Fellow of the Academy of Medicine Malaysia.

Awards and honours
 Panglima Jasa Negara (P.J.N., which carries the title Datuk) - 1999
 Darjah Dato' Paduka Mahkota Perak (DPMP, which carries the title Dato') - 1990
 Johan Setia Mahkota (J.S.M.) - 1991
 Kesatria Mangku Negara (K.M.N.) - 1987
 Commander (Brother) of the Order of St John (CStJ) - 1991
 Serving Brother of the Order of St John (SBStJ) - 1987

References

External links
 

20th-century births
2023 deaths
Malaysian public health doctors
St John Ambulance
Commanders of the Order of Meritorious Service
Officers of the Order of the Defender of the Realm
Companions of the Order of Loyalty to the Crown of Malaysia
Serving Brothers of the Order of St John
Malaysian Muslims
Malaysian people of Malay descent
Academic staff of Nilai University
University of Malaya alumni
Harvard Business School alumni
Year of birth missing